The military history of Italy chronicles a vast time period, lasting from ancient Rome, through the medieval period, the Renaissance, the Italian unification, and into the modern day. The Italian peninsula has been a centre of military conflict throughout European history: because of this, Italy has a long military tradition.

Ancient Italy 

In the 8th century BCE, a group of Italic tribes (Latins in the west, Sabines in the upper valley of the Tiber, Umbrians in the north-east, Samnites in the South, Oscans and others) shared the Italian peninsula with two other major ethnic groups: the Etruscans in the North, and the Greeks in the south.

The Etruscans (Etrusci or Tusci in Latin) were settled north of Rome in Etruria (modern northern Lazio, Tuscany and part of Umbria). They founded cities like Tarquinia, Veii and Volterra and deeply influenced Roman culture, as clearly shown by the Etruscan origin of some of the mythical Roman kings. The origins of the Etruscans are lost in prehistory. Historians have no literature, no texts of religion or philosophy; therefore much of what is known about this civilization is derived from grave goods and tomb findings.

The Italics were war-like as the Etruscans (the gladiatorial displays actually evolved out of Etruscan funerary customs). The Italics and the Etruscans had a significant military tradition. In addition to marking the rank and power of certain individuals in their culture, warfare was a considerable economic boon to their civilization. Like many ancient societies, the Italics and the Etruscans conducted campaigns during summer months, raiding neighboring areas, attempting to gain territory and combating piracy/banditism as a means of acquiring valuable resources such as land, prestige and goods. It is also likely individuals taken in battle would be ransomed back to their families and clans at high cost.

The Greeks had founded many colonies in Southern Italy (that the Romans later called Magna Graecia), such as Cumae, Naples and Taranto, as well as in the eastern two-thirds of Sicily, between 750 and 550 BCE.

After 650 BCE, the Etruscans became dominant in central Italy, and expanded into north Italy founding cities like Mutina (actual Modena) and Felsina (actual Bologna). Roman tradition claimed that Rome had been under the control of seven "etruscan" kings from 753 to 509 BCE beginning with the mythic Romulus who along with his brother Remus were said to have founded the city of Rome.

The northern part of Italy was called Cisalpine Gaul because of the presence of Celtic tribes and the strong influence they had on the region. Non-Celtic people like Ligurians in the western part, and Adriatic Veneti in the eastern, also existed and were the majority of population of Cisalpine Gaul, although they were very influenced by Celts in their culture, and warfare was no exception. The Ligurians practised warfare mainly by ambush and their weaponry was very similar to the Celtic one; the early warfare of Veneti indeed was very similar to the italic, Greek, and illirian ones (e.g. with hoplites and phalanx), but later emerges use of typical Celtic weapons and tactics. 

These many tribes were not united and often disagreed or even conflicted with each other. Tribal warfare was a regular feature of Celtic societies, using war to exercise political control and harass rivals, for economic advantage, and in some cases to conquer territory. An example in this area was the fight between the Celtic Insubres and the Taurini (Ligurian) that Hannibal intervened at, when he went to Italy just after crossing the Alps. The Cisalpine Celtic and Ligurian populations were sought after as mercenaries in the wars of the ancient world, until they were subjected to Rome between the 3rd and 2nd centuries BCE.

Rome 

The early Roman army (c. 500 BCE) was, like those of other contemporary city-states influenced by Greek civilization, a citizen militia which practiced hoplite tactics. It was small (the population of free males of military age was then about 9,000) and organized in five classes (in parallel to the comitia centuriata, the body of citizens organized politically), with three providing hoplites and two providing light infantry. The early Roman army was tactically limited and its stance during this period was essentially defensive. By the 3rd century BCE, the Romans abandoned the hoplite formation in favor of a more flexible system in which smaller groups of 120 (or in some cases 60) men called maniples could maneuver more independently on the battlefield. Thirty maniples arranged in three lines with supporting troops constituted a legion, totaling between 4,000 and 5,000 men. The early Republican legion consisted of five sections, each of which was equipped differently and had different places in formation: the three lines of manipular heavy infantry (hastati, principes and triarii), a force of light infantry (velites), and the cavalry (equites). With the new organization came a new orientation toward the offensive and a much more aggressive posture toward adjoining city-states.

At nominal full strength, an early Republican legion would have included 3,600 to 4,800 heavy infantry, several hundred light infantry and several hundred cavalrymen, for a total of 4,000 to 5,000 men. Legions were often significantly understrength from recruitment failures or following periods of active service due to accidents, battle casualties, disease and desertion. During the Civil War, Pompey's legions in the east were at full strength because recently recruited, while Caesar's legions were in many cases well below nominal strength after long active service in Gaul. This pattern also held true for auxiliary forces.

Until the late Republican period, the typical legionary was a property-owning citizen farmer from a rural area (an adsiduus) who served for particular (often annual) campaigns, and who supplied his own equipment and, in the case of equites, his own mount. Harris suggests that down to 200 BCE, the average rural farmer (who survived) might participate in six or seven campaigns. Freedmen and slaves (wherever resident) and urban citizens did not serve except in rare emergencies. After 200 BCE, economic conditions in rural areas deteriorated as manpower needs increased, so that the property qualifications for service were gradually reduced. Beginning with Gaius Marius in 107 BCE, citizens without property and some urban-dwelling citizens (proletarii) were enlisted and provided with equipment, although most legionaries continued to come from rural areas. Terms of service became continuous and long—up to twenty years if emergencies required it although Brunt argues that six or seven years was more typical. Beginning in the 3rd century BCE, legionaries were paid stipendium (amounts are disputed but Caesar famously "doubled" payments to his troops to 225 denarii a year), could anticipate booty and donatives (distributions of plunder by commanders) from successful campaigns and, beginning at the time of Marius, often were granted allotments of land upon retirement. Cavalry and light infantry attached to a legion (the auxilia) were often recruited in the areas where the legion served. Caesar formed a legion, the Fifth Alaudae, from non-citizens in Transalpine Gaul to serve in his campaigns in Gaul. By the time of Caesar Augustus, the ideal of the citizen-soldier had been abandoned and the legions had become fully professional. Legionaries were paid 900 sesterces a year and could expect a payment of 12,000 sesterces on retirement.

At the end of the Civil War, Augustus reorganized Roman military forces, discharging soldiers and disbanding legions. He retained 28 legions, distributed through the provinces of the Empire. During the Principate, the tactical organization of the Army continued to evolve. The auxilia remained independent cohorts, and legionary troops often operated as groups of cohorts rather than as full legions. A new versatile type of unit, the cohortes equitatae, combining cavalry and legionaries in a single formation could be stationed at garrisons or outposts, could fight on their own as balanced small forces or could combine with other similar units as a larger legion-sized force. This increase in organizational flexibility over time helped ensure the long-term success of Roman military forces.

The Emperor Gallienus (253–268 CE) began a reorganization that created the final military structure of the late Empire. Withdrawing some legionaries from the fixed bases on the border, Gallienus created mobile forces (the Comitatenses or field armies) and stationed them behind and at some distance from the borders as a strategic reserve. The border troops (limitanei) stationed at fixed bases continued to be the first line of defense. The basic unit of the field army was the "regiment", legiones or auxilia for infantry and vexillationes for cavalry. Evidence suggests that nominal strengths may have been 1,200 men for infantry regiments and 600 for cavalry, although many records show lower actual troop levels (800 and 400). Many infantry and cavalry regiments operated in pairs under the command of a comes. In addition to Roman troops, the field armies included regiments of "barbarians" recruited from allied tribes and known as foederati. By 400 CE, foederati regiments had become permanently established units of the Roman army, paid and equipped by the Empire, led by a Roman tribune and used just as Roman units were used. In addition to the foederati, the Empire also used groups of barbarians to fight along with the legions as "allies" without integration into the field armies. Under the command of the senior Roman general present, they were led at lower levels by their own officers.

Military leadership evolved greatly over the course of the history of Rome. Under the monarchy, the hoplite armies would have been led by the kings of Rome. During the early and middle Roman Republic, military forces were under the command of one of the two elected consuls for the year. During the later Republic, members of the Roman Senatorial elite, as part of the normal sequence of elected public offices known as the cursus honorum, would have served first as quaestor (often posted as deputies to field commanders), then as praetor. Following the end of a term as praetor or consul, a Senator might be appointed by the Senate as a propraetor or proconsul (depending on the highest office previously held) to govern a foreign province. More junior officers (down to but not including the level of centurion) were selected by their commanders from their own clientelae or those recommended by political allies among the Senatorial elite. Under Augustus, whose most important political priority was to place the military under a permanent and unitary command, the Emperor was the legal commander of each legion but exercised that command through a legatus (legate) he appointed from the Senatorial elite. In a province with a single legion, the legate would command the legion (legatus legionis) and also serve as provincial governor, while in a province with more than one legion, each legion would be commanded by a legate and the legates would be commanded by the provincial governor (also a legate but of higher rank). During the later stages of the Imperial period (beginning perhaps with Diocletian), the Augustan model was abandoned. Provincial governors were stripped of military authority, and command of the armies in a group of provinces was given to generals (duces) appointed by the Emperor. These were no longer members of the Roman elite but men who came up through the ranks and had seen much practical soldiering. With increasing frequency, these men attempted (sometimes successfully) to usurp the positions of the Emperors who had appointed them. Decreased resources, increasing political chaos and civil war eventually left the Western Empire vulnerable to attack and takeover by neighboring barbarian peoples.

Comparatively less is known about the Roman navy than the Roman army. Prior to the middle of the 3rd century BCE, officials known as duumviri navales commanded a fleet of twenty ships used mainly to control piracy. This fleet was given up in 278 CE and replaced by allied forces. The First Punic War required that Rome build large fleets, and it did so largely with the assistance of and financing from allies. This reliance on allies continued to the end of the Roman Republic. The quinquereme was the main warship on both sides of the Punic Wars and remained the mainstay of Roman naval forces until replaced by the time of Caesar Augustus by lighter and more maneuverable vessels. As compared with a trireme, the quinquereme permitted the use of a mix of experienced and inexperienced crewmen (an advantage for a primarily land-based power), and its lesser maneuverability permitted the Romans to adopt and perfect boarding tactics using a troop of approximately 40 marines in lieu of the ram. Ships were commanded by a navarch, a rank equivalent to a centurion, who were usually not citizens. Potter suggests that because the fleet was dominated by non-Romans, the navy was considered non-Roman and allowed to atrophy in times of peace.

Available information suggests that by the time of the late Empire (350 CE), the Roman navy comprised a number of fleets including both warships and merchant vessels for transportation and supply. Warships were oared sailing galleys with three to five banks of oarsmen. Fleet bases included such ports as Ravenna, Arles, Aquilea, Misenum and the mouth of the Somme River in the West and Alexandria and Rhodes in the East. Flotillas of small river craft (classes) were part of the limitanei (border troops) during this period, based at fortified river harbors along the Rhine and the Danube. The fact that prominent generals commanded both armies and fleets suggests that naval forces were treated as auxiliaries to the army and not as an independent service. The details of command structure and fleet strengths during this period are not well known although it is known that fleets were commanded by prefects.

Middle Ages 

Throughout the Middle Ages, from the collapse of a central Roman government in the late 5th century to the Italian Wars of the Renaissance, Italy was constantly divided between opposing factions fighting for control. At the time of the deposition of Romulus Augustulus (476), the Heruli Confederation governed Italy, but it was displaced by the Ostrogoths, who fought a long war with the Byzantine army in Italy (the Gothic War). The Byzantine came out of the war victorious only to find Italy invaded by a new wave of barbarians led by the Lombards.

The Lombards diminished Byzantine territory to the Exarchate of Ravenna, the Duchy of Rome, the Duchy of Naples, and the far south of Apulia and Calabria. They established a kingdom centred on Pavia in the north. During the interregnum called the Rule of the Dukes (574–584), the dukes of the Lombards invaded Burgundy, but were repulsed by the Merovingian king Guntram, who in turn invaded Italy and took the region of Savoy. The Lombards were forced to elect a new king to organise their defence. For the next two centuries, the Byzantine power in the peninsula was reduced by the Lombard kings, the greatest of which was Liutprand, until it consisted of little more than the tips of the Italian toe and heel, Rome and its environs being practically independent under the popes and the Neapolitan coast under its dukes.

In 774, Charlemagne of the Franks invaded and conquered the Lombard kingdom. In the south of the peninsula, the Duchy of Benevento remained independent of Frankish dominion, however. During the period of Carolingian strength, Charlemagne's descendants governed the north of Italy in relative peace, except for the brief period of the rebellion of Bernard and the constant raids from the Slavs to the east and the Saracens to the south. Pirates harassed the Adriatic and Ligurian coasts and the islands of Corsica and Sardinia. The south was very different, as the Lombards were at the height of there power there. Warfare between Lombard and Greek, especially the Greek city-states of the Tyrrhenian, was endemic. The Greek cities fell out of the orbit of Constantinople and Byzantine possessions shrank to their smallest mark as the Lombards and the Saracens increased their predations. In 831, the Arabs conquered Palermo and in 902 they conquered Taormina, ending the conquest of Sicily. They likewise established their presence on the peninsula, especially on the Garigliano and in Bari. The story of the incessant conflicts of the states of the Mezzogiorno is chaotic until the arrival of the Normans in the early 11th century (1016). Under their leadership, the Jews of the south found themselves eventually united, the Arabs expelled, and the whole Mezzogiorno subjugated to the Hauteville dynasty of kings of Sicily (1130).

The second half of the Middle Ages in Italy was marked by frequent conflict between the Holy Roman Empire and the Papacy, the latter eventually emerging victorious in that it ultimately prevented political unification of northern Italy under Imperial rule. Imperial invasions were led by more or less all medieval Emperors, the most notable episodes being the end of the Investiture controversy by the pilgrimage of Henry IV, Holy Roman Emperor at Canossa in 1077 and the no less than five major invasions staged by Frederick Barbarossa against the Lombard League, culminating in the sack of Milan in 1162, after which every building in the city was demolished, except the churches. The lasting conflict led to the emergence of the Guelph and the Ghibelline parties in northern Italy, supporting respectively the Pope (and the independent cities) and the Emperor, though siding with a party was often dictated by other political considerations (more or less each city has belonged to both parties). In May 1176, the Lombard League, led by a revived Milan, defeated the Emperor Frederick Barbarossa at Legnano.

The victory of the Guelph party meant the end of Imperial overlordship over northern Italy, and the formation of city-states such as Florence, Venice, Milan, Genoa or Siena. While Venice was turning to the seas, supporting, and acquiring large loot from, the 1204 Fourth Crusade's sack of Constantinople, the other city-states were struggling for control of mainland, Florence being the rising power of the time (annexation of Pisa in 1406).

Sicily was invaded in 1266 by Charles I, duke of Anjou; the Angevines were however toppled in the 1282 Sicilian Vespers, and Peter III of Aragon invaded the island. This set the background for later French claims over Naples and Sicily.

Disintegration of the Holy Roman Empire and the Hundred Years War in neighbouring France meant that Italy was more or less left in peace during the 15th century; this allowed its cities to grow rich and to become attractive preys for its neighbours during the 16th century.

Italian Wars 

The relative peace that had prevailed in Italy following the Treaty of Lodi was shattered by the beginning of the Italian Wars in 1494. Ludovico Sforza, seeking allies, suggested to Charles VIII of France that the latter press his claim to the throne of Naples; Charles obliged and launched an invasion of the peninsula. The French march to, and capture of, Naples was accomplished with relative ease—the Italian states being shocked at the brutality of French tactics and the efficacy of the new French artillery—but Charles was forced to withdraw from Italy in 1495, after a hastily constructed alliance fought him at the Battle of Fornovo. Charles died in 1498, but the conflict he started would be continued by his successors; the Italian Wars would last until 1559, involving, at various times, all the major states of western Europe (France, Spain, the Holy Roman Empire, England, Scotland, the Republic of Venice, the Papal States, and most of the city-states of Italy) as well as the Ottoman Empire, and rapidly becoming a general struggle for power and territory among the various participants, marked with an increasing degree of alliances, counter-alliances, and regular betrayals.

In 1499, Louis XII of France launched the Second Italian War, invading Lombardy and seizing the Duchy of Milan. He then reached an agreement with Ferdinand I of Spain to divide Naples. By 1502, combined French and Spanish forces had seized control of the Kingdom; disagreements about the terms of the partition led to a war between Louis and Ferdinand. By 1503, Louis, having been defeated at the Battle of Cerignola and Battle of Garigliano, was forced to withdraw from Naples, which was left under the control of the Spanish viceroy, Gonzalo Fernández de Córdoba. Meanwhile, Pope Alexander VI attempted to carve a Borgia state from the Romagna through the efforts of Cesare Borgia.

In 1508, Pope Julius II formed the League of Cambrai, in which France, the Papacy, Spain and the Holy Roman Empire agreed to attack the Republic of Venice and partition her mainland territories. The resulting War of the League of Cambrai was a kaleidoscope of shifting alliances. The French defeated the Venetian army at the Battle of Agnadello, capturing extensive territories; but Julius, now regarding France as a greater threat, left the League and allied himself with Venice. After a year of fighting over the Romagna, he proclaimed a Holy League against the French; this rapidly grew to include England, Spain, and the Holy Roman Empire. The French were driven from Italy in late 1512, despite their victory at the Battle of Ravenna earlier that year, leaving Milan in the hands of Maximilian Sforza and his Swiss mercenaries; but the Holy League fell apart over the subject of dividing the spoils, and in 1513 Venice allied with France, agreeing to partition Lombardy between them. The French invasion of Milan in 1513 was defeated at the Battle of Novara, which was followed by a series of defeats for the French alliance; but Francis I of France defeated the Swiss at the Battle of Marignano in 1515, and the treaties of Noyon and Brussels left France and Venice in control of northern Italy.

The election of Charles of Spain as Holy Roman Emperor in 1519 led to a collapse of relations between France and the Habsburgs which resulted in the Italian War of 1521, in which France and Venice were pitted against England, the Papacy, and Charles's Habsburg possessions. Prosper Colonna defeated the French at the Battle of Bicocca, driving them from Lombardy. A series of abortive invasions of France by the allies and of Italy by the French continued until 1524, when Francis personally led a French army into Lombardy, only to be defeated and captured at the Battle of Pavia; imprisoned in Madrid, Francis was forced to agree to extensive concessions. Released in 1526, Francis repudiated the terms of the agreement, allied himself with Venice, the Papacy, Milan, and England, and launched the War of the League of Cognac. In 1527, Imperial troops sacked Rome itself; the French expedition to capture Naples the next year failed, leading Francis and Charles to conclude the Treaty of Cambrai. Charles then concluded a series of treaties at Barcelona and Bologna which eliminated all his opponents save the Florentine Republic, which was subdued by the Siege of Florence and returned to the Medici.

The remainder of the Italian Wars—which flared up again in 1535—was primarily a struggle between the Habsburgs and the Valois; while Italy was, at times, a battlefield, the Italian states played little further role in the fighting. The French managed to seize and hold Turin, defeating an Imperial army at the Battle of Ceresole in 1544; but the warfare continued (primarily in northern France) until Henry II of France was forced to accept the Peace of Cateau-Cambrésis in 1559, in which he renounced any further claims to Italy.

By the end of the wars in 1559, Habsburg Spain had been established as the premier power of Europe, to the detriment of France. The states of Italy, which had wielded power disproportionate to their size during the Middle Ages and the Renaissance, were reduced to second-rate powers or destroyed entirely.

The Italian Wars had a number of consequences for the work and workplace of Leonardo da Vinci; his plans for a "Gran Cavallo" horse statue in 1495 were dropped when the seventy tons of bronze intended for the statue were instead cast into weapons to save Milan. Later, following a chance encounter with Francis I after the Battle of Marignano, Leonardo agreed to move to France, where he spent his final years.

In France, Henry II was fatally wounded in a joust held during the celebrations of the peace. His death led to the accession of his 15-year-old son Francis II, who in turn soon died. The French monarchy was thrown into turmoil, which increased further with the outbreak of the French Wars of Religion in 1562.

Early modern period 

Government-funded encyclopedias produced in Italy the 1930s listed notable Italian officers of the early modern period, over 4,100 names from 1560 to 1710. Of the 3,462 individuals for which place of origin is known, 20 percent came from the Venetian Republic (half from the capital city itself), 14.4 percent from the Papal States, 13.7 percent from Tuscany, 11.5 percent from Piedmont-Savoy, 10 percent from Naples (almost all from Campania, especially the capital city), 9.5 percent from Lombardy, 8.3 percent from Emilia, 7.3 percent from Liguria and Corsica (the Republic of Genoa), 2.7 percent from Sicily (almost all from the cities of Palermo and Messina), 2.3 percent from the Friulan marches and Trentino, and 0.3 percent from Sardinia.

Partial foreign domination 
Following the Italian Wars (1494 to 1559), Italy saw a long period of relative peace, however, Southern Italy (Kingdom of Naples and Kingdom of Sicily) and the Duchy of Milan were under the control of the Spanish Empire from 1559 to 1713. And then, in the case of Milan under the Habsburg monarchy from 1714 to 1796. During the French Revolutionary Wars, Italy became the scene of the Italian campaigns of the French Revolutionary Wars. In 1796, Italy was invaded by French forces under the command of general Napoleon Bonaparte (later King of Italy). Italy was conquered by the French and became organized into French client republics. The Congress of Vienna (1814) restored the situation of the late 18th century, which was however quickly overturned by the incipient movement of Italian unification.

18th century

Piedmont 
In 1700 the army was the main instrument used by the Savoy sovereigns (such as Victor Amedeus II and his successor Charles Emanuel III), who assured Piedmont its territorial expansion and the rise to European power, participating in the main wars that broke out in the period (wars of succession of Spain, Poland and Austria ). It is no coincidence that in this period Piedmont was called "the Italian Prussia". During the whole century there was a general tendency to enlarge the army, in 1774 the total number of Savoyan troops reached 100.000 units and it was in that occasion that the regulation concerning the duration of the permanent military service was introduced.

Naples 
In 1734 there was the passage of the Kingdom of Naples and the Kingdom of Sicily from Habsburg to Bourbon rule as a result of the war of Polish succession. In the two previous centuries southern Italy and Sicily were part of the Spanish Empire as viceroys; later, in 1707, the Kingdom of Naples passed to Austria as part of the war of Spanish succession, while the Kingdom of Sicily was given to Victor Amadeus II of Savoy in 1713 with the peace of Utrecht.

The official date of birth of the Neapolitan army is however linked to the law of 25 November 1743, by which King Charles ordered the constitution of 12 provincial regiments, all composed of citizens of the Kingdom. In the spring of the following year the newborn army underwent its first test against the Austria at the Battle of Velletri. It marked its first great victory, in which entirely Neapolitan regiments took part, such as the "Terra di Lavoro" (which after the battle could boast the title of "Real", reserved only for veteran regiments).

Venice 
On April 26, 1729 the Senate approved the military reform proposed by Marshal Count Schulenburg. On the basis of this reform, the land army was in peacetime composed of 20460 men. 

Venice fought the Turkish in seventh Ottoman–Venetian War, one particular episode of this conflict was the battle of Corfu in 1716-1717 where 70,000 Turks tried to conquer the island then garrisoned by about 5,000 Venetian infantrymen, here at the end of the siege the Ottomans left on the field over 5,000 dead and 20 banners against just 400 dead Venetians, in 1784 there was an expedition led by Admiral Angelo Emo against the barbary pirate concluded with the bombing of the fort of Susa.

The republic in 1788 had an army of about 30,000 units with the possibility to increase the number through the use of local militias also called cernide. At the end of the Republic the Venetian military instrument was remarkable for the Italian averages (probably the third largest army in Italy).

Italian Unification and colonial period 

The Italian unification (Italian: il Risorgimento, or "The Resurgence") was the political and social movement that unified different states of the Italian peninsula into the kingdom of Italy. There is a lack of consensus on the exact dates for the beginning and the end of Italian unification, but many scholars agree that the process began with the end of Napoleonic rule and the Congress of Vienna in 1814, and approximately ended with the Franco-Prussian War in 1871 and the conquest of Rome, though Trento and Triest (the last città irredente, cities that Italian nationalists considered as Italian under foreign domination) did not join the Kingdom of Italy until after World War I.

The First (1848–1849), Second (1859) and Third Italian War of Independence (1866) were fought against the Austrian Empire as part of the process to unify the Italian peninsula. The kingdom of Italy did not participate in the Franco-Prussian War of 1870–1871, but the defeat of France and the abdication of French emperor Napoleon III enabled Italy to capture Rome (the city was de jure declared the capital of Italy in 1861), the last remnant of the Papal States (ruled by the Catholic church). The military and political protection provided to the Papal States by Napoleon III had until then prevented this.

Italian conquest of Eritrea and Somalia 
Italy took part in the scramble for Africa (the European conquest and colonization of Africa that started in the late 19th century). Between 1881 and 1905 Italy colonized parts of the Horn of Africa, forming the colonies of Eritrea and Italian Somalia, but the conquest of Ethiopia was stopped at the Battle of Adwa in 1896.

Boxer Rebellion 
Italian warships and infantry took part in the suppression of the Boxer Rebellion in China (1900).

The conquest of Libya 
During the Italo-Turkish War (1911–1912) Italy occupied Tripolitania and Cyrenaica that later were unified in the colony of Libya. Italy also conquered the Dodecanese island group in the Aegean Sea. In this war Italy pioneered the military use of aircraft and airships (for bombing, artillery spotting and reconnaissance).

World War I 

In spite of its official status as member of the Triple Alliance together with Germany and Austria-Hungary, in the years before the outbreak of the conflict the Italian government had enhanced its diplomatic efforts towards United Kingdom and France. This was because the Italian government had grown convinced that a support of Austria (which had been also the traditional enemy of Italy during the 19th century Risorgimento) would not grant to Italy the Italian-speaking lands the country was aiming for in its territorial expansion: Trieste, Istria, Zara and Dalmatia, all Austrian possessions. In fact, a secret agreement signed with France in 1902 practically nullified Italy's membership in the Triple Alliance.

A few days after the outbreak of the conflict, on 3 August 1914, the government, led by the conservative Antonio Salandra, declared that Italy would not commit its troops, maintaining that the Triple Alliance had only a defensive stance, whereas Austria-Hungary had been the aggressor. In reality, both Salandra and the minister of Foreign Affairs, Sidney Sonnino, started diplomatic activities to probe which side was ready to grant the best reward for Italy's entrance in the war. Although the majority of the cabinet (including former Prime Minister Giovanni Giolitti) was firmly contrary to the intervention, numerous intellectuals, including socialists such as Ivanoe Bonomi, Leonida Bissolati and Benito Mussolini, declared in favour of the intervention, which was then mostly supported by the Nationalist and the Liberal parties.

The diplomatic moves led to the London Pact (26 April 1915), signed by Sonnino without the approval of the Italian Parliament. By the Pact, in case of victory Italy was to be given Trentino and the South Tyrol up to the Brenner Pass, the entire Austrian Littoral (with Trieste, Gorizia-Gradisca and Istria, but without Fiume), parts of western Carniola (Idrija and Ilirska Bistrica) and north-western Dalmatia with Zadar and most of the islands, but without Split. Other agreements concerned the sovereignty of the port of Valona, the province of Antalya in Turkey and part of the German colonies in Africa.

Germany and Austria-Hungary had only advanced the possibility of negotiating parts of the Trentino and Eastern Friuli, without Gorizia and Trieste. The offer of the French colony of Tunisia was deemed unsatisfactory.

In April 1915 Italy joined the Entente and on 3 May 1915 officially rejected the Triple Alliance. In the following days Giolitti and the neutralist majority of the Parliament fought to keep Italy out of the conflict, while the nationalists demonstrated in the squares in favour of entrance into the war (the nationalist poet Gabriele D'Annunzio defined them le radiose giornate di Maggio - "the sunny days of May"). On 13 May Salandra presented his resignation to King Victor Emmanuel III. Giolitti, fearful of a further blow to governing institutions, declined to succeed as prime minister and also resigned. Italy thenceforth entered the war under the impetus of a relative minority of its population and politicians.

Interwar period 
In 1922, Benito Mussolini brought the fascist party to power in Italy with his March on Rome on 28 October. Mussolini repeatedly stated his dream of the Mediterranean Sea becoming an "Italian lake" (Mare Nostrum, "our sea") and valued war, saying "Though words are beautiful things, rifles, machine guns, planes, and cannon are still more beautiful".

Corfu incident (1923) 
In the Corfu incident Italy forced Greece to pay reparations and apologize for the murder of an Italian general by bombarding and temporarily occupying the Greek island of Corfu. This incident was indicative of the aggressive posture of the new Fascist regime.

Conquest of Ethiopia (1935–1936)
The Second Italo-Ethiopian War was to be Mussolini's way of making up for Italy's embarrassing defeat at the hands of the Ethiopians in the First Italo-Ethiopian War in 1896, and was also a chance to expand the Italian empire by taking one of the last regions of Africa not controlled by other European powers and divert the populace from economic woes. General Emilio de Bono put on record that preparations for the invasion of Ethiopia (Abyssinia) had been going on since 1932 as roads were being built from Italian Somaliland into Ethiopian territory, though Mussolini constantly claimed that he was not a "collector of deserts" and would never think of invading. Ethiopians protested this build-up to war which eventually led up to a border clash at Walwal. Mussolini called this clash "unprovoked aggression" by Ethiopia and Italian forces invaded on 3 October 1935, led by de Bono. In only three days the Italians had captured Adwa by committing the world's first mass aerial bombardment of civilians. In December Pietro Badoglio replaced de Bono as commander of the invasion because of de Bono's cautious advance. In violation of the Geneva convention, the Italian military committed war crimes by extensively using chemical warfare against the Ethiopian military and, even more so, against Ethiopian civilians as well as attacking Ethiopian, British, and Swedish Red Cross facilities. On 31 March 1936, a desperate final counter-attack by Emperor Haile Selassie I of Ethiopia, was carried out, though word of the attack had already gotten to the Italians, giving them victory in the Battle of Maychew again through the use of chemical weapons. Only a few days later the Ethiopian capital Addis Ababa was conquered, allowing Italy to annex the country on 7 May, proclaiming Victor Emmanuel III Emperor of Ethiopia. Italy's East African possessions was unified into the colony of Italian East Africa.

Intervention in the Spanish Civil War (1936–1939)

On 17 July 1936, Francisco Franco and the rest of Nationalist Spain's forces began a rebellion against Republican Spain that was to last three years, called the Spanish Civil War. Franco was fairly sure that he would be able to secure German and Italian help for his National Faction, sending emissaries out on 20 July to achieve this. Both did indeed pledge support, sending in the Corpo Truppe Volontarie from Italy and the Legión Cóndor from Nazi Germany, as well as weapons and aircraft. Mussolini was very devoted, eventually sending in 37,000 men and huge numbers of planes to ensure that this "campaign against communism" would succeed. The foreign press started to heap pressure on Mussolini when Italian troops suffered a major defeat at Guadalajara, which led to Mussolini sending in normal troops rather than militia to fight in Spain, eventually ruining the Italian economy with the expense of a war Mussolini thought would end any day. This war also distracted Italy, allowing Germany to carry out the annexation of Austria with the Anschluss, a move that otherwise may have been a breaking point between the two powers, due to Austria's alliance with Fascist Italy. The war was supposed to be a staging ground for Italian tactics, potential time to fix any creases out of the system, but Italy continued during World War II to use the same tactics as long before that, unlike Germany's new revolutionary war tactics.

Conquest of Albania (1939)
As Germany was occupying Czechoslovakia, Mussolini decided to accompany that invasion with his own invasion of Albania. Albania had long been politically dominated by Italy and several of its military officers were actually Italian. Albanian King Zog was in fairly serious debt and wanted help from Italy, so Mussolini sent foreign minister Gian Galeazzo Ciano to him with a list of demands, which Ciano described as impossible to accept. Once King Zog declined, Mussolini said that he must accept the demands by 7 April 1939, or Italy would invade. The invaders had already disembarked to invade before that time. General Alfredo Guzzoni led two Bersaglieri divisions with a battalion of tanks in the invasion, where resistance was minor, though various organizational problems in the Italian military showed themselves. King Zog fled the country to Greece, was granted asylum in Athens and eventually got to London. On 12 April, the Albanian parliament voted to unite their country with Italy, giving Victor Emmanuel III the Albanian crown.

Pact of Steel
On May 22, 1939, the Pact of Steel was signed by Galeazzo Ciano and German foreign minister Joachim von Ribbentrop, effectively allying the two powers. Despite the fairly good relations the two states had had, many Italians were against this alliance, thinking of it as more of a submission to Germany, knowing that Italian interests were likely not to be favored in the relationship. The alliance also technically forced Italy to join in any war that Germany had entered, so that Germany could at any time present the treaty and force Mussolini to enter, though they did not end up using this right.

World War II 

Nazi Germany invaded Poland on 1 September 1939, but Italy remained neutral for the following ten months even though it was one of the Axis powers.

Italian dictator Benito Mussolini's Under-Secretary for War Production, Carlo Favagrossa, had estimated that Italy could not possibly be prepared for such a war until at least October 1942. This had been made clear during Italo-German negotiations for the Pact of Steel whereby it was stipulated that neither signatory was to make war without the other earlier than 1943. Although considered a major power, the Italian industrial sector was relatively weak compared to other European major powers. Italian industry did not equal more than 15% of that of France or of Britain in militarily critical areas such as automobile production: the number of automobiles in Italy before the war ranged at c. 372,000, in comparison to c. 2,500,000 in Britain and France. The lack of a stronger automotive industry made it difficult for Italy to mechanize its military. Italy still had a predominantly agricultural-based economy, with demographics more akin to a developing country (high illiteracy, poverty, rapid population growth and a high proportion of adolescents) and a proportion of GNP derived from industry less than that of Czechoslovakia, Hungary and Sweden, in addition to the other great powers. In terms of strategic materials, in 1940, Italy produced 4.4, 0.01, 1.2 and 2.1 Mt of coal, crude oil, iron ore and steel, respectively. By comparison, Great Britain produced 224.3, 11.9, 17.7, and 13.0 Mt and Germany produced 364.8, 8.0, 29.5 and 21.5 Mt of coal, crude oil, iron ore and steel, respectively. Most of the raw material needs could only be fulfilled through importation and no effort was made to stockpile key materials before the entry into war. Also, approximately one quarter of Italy's merchant fleet were present at foreign ports and given no forewarning of Mussolini's rash decision to enter the war and were immediately impounded. Another handicap was the large number of weapons and supplies given by Italy practically for free to the Spanish forces fighting under Franco during the Spanish Civil War between 1936 and 1939. The Italians also sent the "Corps of Volunteer Troops" (Corpo Truppe Volontarie) to fight for Franco. The financial cost of this war was between 6 and 8.5 billion lire, approximately 14 to 20% of annual expenditure. Added to these issues was Italy's extreme debt position. When Benito Mussolini took office in 1921 the government debt was 93 billion lire, un-repayable in the short to medium term. Yet only two years later this debt increased to 405 billion lire.

The Italian Royal Army (Regio Esercito) therefore remained comparatively depleted and weak at the commencement of the war. The Italian tanks were of poor quality, and radios were few in number. The bulk of the Italian artillery dated from World War I. The Italian Air Force (Regia Aeronautica's) primary fighter was the Fiat CR-42, though an advanced design for a biplane with excellent performance characteristics, it was obsolete compared to the then current generation monoplane fighters of other nations. The Italian Royal Navy (Regia Marina) had no aircraft carriers. In addition, the Royal Air Force (Regia Aeronautica) could field approximately 1,760 aircraft, of which only 900 could be considered as "front-line machines".

Yet whilst equipment was lacking and outdated, Italian authorities were acutely aware of the need to maintain a modern army and were taking the necessary steps to modernize in accordance with their very own relatively advanced tactical principles. Almost 40% of the 1939 budget was allocated to military spending. Awareness existed, albeit belatedly, of the need to have close air support for the Navy and the decision to build carriers was taken. And whilst the majority of equipment was obsolescent and poor, appropriate steps were being taken whereby quality equipment was being developed. For example, the three series 5 fighters were capable of meeting the best allied fighters on equal terms, but only a few hundred of each were produced. The  Fiat G55 Centauro received much German interest and was defined by Oberst Petersen, advisor to Goering, as the "best Axis fighter." The Carro Armato P40 tank, roughly equivalent to the M4 Sherman and Panzer IV, was designed in 1940, but no prototype was produced until 1942 and developers/manufacturers not able to roll out any of these tanks before Armistice. This was owing, in part, to the lack of sufficiently powerful engines, which were themselves undergoing a development push. Unlike the Allies, Italian tank designers did not think to use old aircraft engines, which were available in relative abundance, and would have certainly facilitated more rapid tank development. Total tank production for the war (≈3,500) was less than the number of tanks used by Germany in its invasion of France. The Italians were also reported to be the first to use self-propelled guns, both in close support and anti-tank roles, and their, for example, 75/46 (& 75/32), 90/53 (a peer of the German 88/55), 102/35 and 47/32 mm, and 20 mm AA guns were not obsolete. Also of note were the AB 41 and the Camionetta AS 42 which were regarded as excellent vehicles of their type. None of these developments precluded the fact that the bulk of the equipment was obsolescent and poor. However, it was this relatively weak economy, lack of suitable raw materials and inability to produce suitable quantities of armaments and supplies which was predominant reason for Italian military failure.

On paper, Italy had one of the largest armies, but this was far from reality. According to the estimates of Bierman and Smith, the Italian regular army could field only about 200,000 troops at the start of World War II. Irrespective of the attempts to modernize, the majority of Italian army personnel were lightly armed infantry lacking sufficient motor transport. There was insufficient budget to train the men in the services such that in World War II the bulk of the personnel received much of their training at the front, when it was too late to be of use. Air units had not been trained to operate with the naval fleet and the majority of ships had been built for fleet actions, not the convoy protection duties which they were mostly employed for during the war. Regardless, a critical lack of fuel kept naval activities to a minimum.

Senior leadership was also an issue. Mussolini personally assumed control of all three individual military service ministries with the intention of influencing detailed planning. Comando Supremo (the Italian High Command) consisted of only a small complement of staff that could do little more than inform the individual service commands of Mussolini's intentions, after which it was up to the individual service commands to develop these into proper plans and execute. The result was that there was no central direction for operations and the three military services tended to work independently, focusing only on their fields, with little inter-service cooperation. The Army itself was essentially split into two different institutions; those institutionally loyal to the king (Regio Esercito) and those to Mussolini, and discrepancies in pay existed for personnel of equal rank, but from different units.

Following the German conquest of Poland, Mussolini would change his mind repeatedly as to whether he would enter the war. The British commander in Africa, General Archibald Wavell, correctly predicted that Mussolini's pride would ultimately cause him to enter the war. Wavell would compare Mussolini's situation to that of someone at the top of a diving board: "I think he must do something. If he cannot make a graceful dive, he will at least have to jump in somehow; he can hardly put on his dressing-gown and walk down the stairs again."

Some historians believe that Italian leader Benito Mussolini was induced to enter the war against the Allies by secret negotiations with British Prime Minister Winston Churchill, with whom he had an active mail correspondence between September 1939 and June 1940. The journalist Luciano Garibaldi wrote that "in those letters (which disappeared at Lake Como in 1945) Churchill may have extorted Mussolini to enter the war to mitigate Hitler's demands and dissuade him from continuing hostilities against Great Britain as France was inexorably moving toward defeat. In light of this, Mussolini could urge Hitler turn against the USSR, the common enemy of both Churchill and Mussolini".

Initially, the entry into the war was clearly political opportunism, which led to a lack of consistency in planning, with principal objectives and enemies being changed with little regard for the consequences. Mussolini was well aware of the military and material deficiencies but thought the war would be over soon and did not expect to do much fighting. This led to confusion amongst ordinary Italians and soldiers who had little idea of what they were fighting for and, hence, had little conviction and saw little justification for it. As the war progressed and one disaster followed another, Comando Supremo were forced to take more serious steps in their planning.

France 
As the war looked increasingly bad for the allies, with the impending German conquest of Belgium, the Netherlands, and France, Mussolini could no longer hold himself back and declared war on the allies on 10 June 1940. To Mussolini it seemed that the war was already nearly over, and he wanted to make sure that Italy at least got a position at the peace tables at the end and obtained such lands as Corsica, Nice, and more North African territory. The Italian offensive against France did not actually begin until ten days after the declaration of war, and Italian troops (fighting against a numerically inferior French force, which was however well-entrenched in the Alpine Line) were very slow to capture territory, while Germany had already taken hold of Paris. The Italians made little progress into French territory at the cost of heavy casualties. On 24 June, France agreed to an armistice. The Italian occupation zone consisted of 832 square kilometers.

Africa 

Mussolini's entry into the war was at least bad news for the United Kingdom, as the Regia Marina would now oppose them in Mediterranean waters. Italian armies in Libya and East Africa could also potentially have knocked British troops completely out of Egypt, having half a million men in Africa compared to the United Kingdom's fifty thousand. However, British troops took the initiative in Africa while Italy was still having trouble pacifying Ethiopia and General Wavell kept up a constantly moving front of raids on Italian positions that proved to be successful. On 14 June a successful surprise attack was made on Fort Capuzzo by the British, though it was not meant as a permanent gain as the British were using far more mobile tactics at the time. By mid-September, casualty listings indicate that Italy had lost 3,000 troops where the United Kingdom had only lost slightly over 490, despite Italy's land numbers and air superiority at the time.

On 13 September 1940, Italy began a very slow advance eastward into Egypt. The Italians advanced with six divisions. After three days, they stopped and set up a chain of fortified camps near Sidi Barrani. However, the chain of camps were too far apart from one another. This allowed Wavell make a crippling blow to the Italian forces around Sidi Barrani right at the start of what was to become Operation Compass. Richard O'Connor led the initial attack against the Italian camps. O'Connor moved between the camps and around to the Italian rear. This greatly surprised the Italians and the British were able to immediately capture four thousand prisoners. This attack alone could have effectively annihilated the Italian army in North Africa. But the British commanders did not foresee such a large victory. Instead, the initial attack was thought of as a large-scale raid. For this reason, no infantry division was available to press home the British opportunity at Sidi Barrani. So the remaining Italian troops managed to escape safely to Bardia. However, Bardia was captured by the British within three weeks.

The Italian campaign in East Africa was initially more successful, as the Italians captured British Somaliland and small parts of Sudan and Kenya, but lack of fuel and resources then forced them to abandon any further intent of advance and take up a defensive posture against an expected counterattack. This counterattack came from two Indian divisions from Sudan, three divisions from Kenya and an amphibious attack from Aden, in co-operation with Ethiopian Arbegnoch rebels. The Allied forces captured Somalia in February, Eritrea in March–April (after the decisive Battle of Keren), and Addis Ababa, capital of Ethiopia, in April. The Duke of Aosta, viceroy of Italian East Africa, surrendered at Amba Alagi in May. Forces in Italian East Africa were somewhat cut short by the Regia Aeronautica's forced presence in the Battle of Britain at the time, leaving only 150 planes in Ethiopia, as well by the impossibility of receiving supplies from Italy. Some Italian garrisons, such as Gondar and Culqualber, held out till November 1941, and a small number of Italians waged a guerrilla war for some more time, some continuing till 1943.

Campaigning in North Africa then fell to Erwin Rommel over any Italian generals, as many Panzer units came into the theatre from Germany as the Afrika Korps. However, the bulk of the Axis army in North Africa was still Italian. Rommel was at first very successful, reaching the Egyptian border again in less than a fortnight as he caught Wavell off-guard. Another British offensive was crushed, and Rommel made his way to El Alamein. This made Mussolini believe the end was near, as he flew to Africa, planning to enter the capital of Egypt triumphantly, only to wait three weeks, then fly back to Rome. Field Marshal Montgomery won at El Alamein in October 1942 for the British. This victory coincided with Operation Torch, America's landing in French North Africa, and the Battle of Stalingrad's outcome, destroying Axis morale. After the final loss of Libya in January 1943, Italian and German forces fought the Tunisian Campaign and finally surrendered on 13 May 1943.

Greece 
With very little preparation after this disaster in Africa and the ensuing retirement of Rodolfo Graziani, Mussolini then decided on an invasion of Greece as his next move to keep in pace with Germany's recent occupation of Romania. After large propaganda campaigns and even the sinking of a Greek light cruiser, Mussolini then handed an ultimatum to Ioannis Metaxas, Prime Minister of Greece, which would initiate the Greco-Italian War. Hitler was against Mussolini's invasion (as it would require German troops' help later on), but Mussolini continued without German knowledge, as he felt that the Nazis had invaded countries too many times without telling Mussolini beforehand.

Mussolini was very unsure of what date to invade, as he changed his mind many times, even five times in one segment of fifteen minutes. Eventually he decided on 28 October, the anniversary of the March on Rome, though staff headquarters was not aware until they heard the date on London radio. In about two weeks, the Italian army was already retreating back into Albania, for conditions at this time of year were very detrimental to mountain warfare and general organization problems continued throughout the military. Franco of the recently victorious Fascist side in the Spanish Civil War was pondering entrance into World War II, but Italy's failure in Greece put him off of the idea. Hitler then came in to rescue Mussolini's troops, gaining him the upper hand in all politics and military operations for the rest of the war.

Soviet Union 

Mussolini was actually in the middle of negotiating a commercial treaty with the Soviet Union when Hitler invaded his former ally in fighting Poland 22 June 1941. However, Mussolini was taken once again by Hitler's promise of quick victory and would eventually send a total of 200,000 troops to the Eastern front, initially organized as the Italian Expeditionary Corps in Russia. To begin with, three divisions were sent, though only one division was at all motorized, but that division had no tanks.

After some large initial losses in the "Celere" Division, Mussolini sent four new infantry divisions and three Alpini (alpine) divisions to the Soviet Union to officially make his forces an army in July 1942 (Italian Army in Russia). But instead of being deployed in the Caucasus Mountains as expected, the Italian units were tasked with holding the front in the Don river plains. As a result of this disastrous strategic decision, the Alpine troops armed, trained and equipped for mountain warfare and the under strength Italian infantry divisions were pitted against tanks and mechanized infantry, to counter which they were neither equipped nor trained. The Soviet offensive Operation Little Saturn wiped out the majority of the Italian troops, with only the 2nd "Tridentina" Alpine division escaping annihilation. By the end of February 1943, the few remaining Italian troops were being withdrawn, a huge blow to public opinion of the Fascist government in Italy. The remnants of the Italian Army in Russia was still in Italy at the time of the Italian Armistice in September 1943 that led to it being officially disbanded.

Sicily and armistice 
On 10 July 1943, a combined force of American and British Commonwealth troops invaded Sicily in Operation Husky. German generals again took the lead in the defence and, although they lost the island, they succeeded in ferrying large numbers of German and Italian forces safely off Sicily to the Italian mainland. With the loss of Sicily, popular support for the war diminished in Italy. On 25 July 1943, the Grand Council of Fascism ousted Italian dictator Benito Mussolini and a new Italian government, led by General Pietro Badoglio and King Victor Emmanuel III, took over in Italy. Although the new government declared that Italy would go on fighting with the Axis, it immediately began secret negotiations with the Allies to end the fighting and to come over to the Allied side. On 3 September, a secret armistice was signed with the Allies at Fairfield Camp in Sicily. The armistice was announced to the public on 8 September. By then, the Allies were on the Italian mainland (landing unopposed because of the armistice). The Germans were aware that the Italy might defect from the Axis and strengthened their forces in Italy in preparation during the time of Italy's secret negotiations with the Allies. In the event, the Italian armed forces were given unclear instructions on how to treat their former German allies. Resistance was therefore slight as the Germans moved in and disarmed the Italians and took control of the northern part of Italy. (The exception to this was the navy that received orders to steam out of reach of the Germans. Therefore, few Italian ships fell into German hands.) The captured Italian soldiers were given the choice of imprisonment or to keep fighting for Germany. A minority choose to fight with the Germans. In the Balkans, that Italy had previously occupied alongside Germany, thousands of Italian soldiers evaded capture and joined the local resistance movements. To circumvent the ban on using prisoners of war as forced labor, the Germans re-designated their Italian prisoners as "military internees" and shipped them to Germany as slave labor.

The Germans freed Mussolini in the Gran Sasso raid (12 September 1943) and set him up as the leader of the Italian Social Republic (RSI) puppet state that kept fighting the Allies until it collapsed when the German forces in Italy surrendered in the spring of 1945.

The Allies were of two minds on how to treat the Kingdom of Italy after the armistice. The US wanted to treat the Kingdom of Italy as an equal member of the Allies, while the British wanted to treat the Kingdom like a defeated enemy. The armed forces of the Kingdom of Italy did therefore not enter the war against Germany in full force, although "Co-Belligerent" forces (the Italian Co-Belligerent Army, the Italian Co-Belligerent Air Force and the Italian Co-Belligerent Navy) were eventually set up and fought with the Allies. The post-armistice period also saw the rise of a large Italian resistance movement that fought the Germans and the RSI in the north.

Aftermath of World War II 
Defeat in World War II led to the loss of the entire Italian Colonial Empire (including colonies that had not been conquered by the Fascist government (such as Libya)) among other territorial losses as stipulated in the Treaty of Peace with Italy, 1947.

Post World War II 

Post-war Italy adopted a republican constitution and became one of the founding members of the Western Bloc military alliance NATO (North Atlantic Treaty Organization) that was formed 4 April 1949 and remains a member as of 2019.

Multinational Force in Lebanon (1982–1984) 
In 1982 Italian forces were deployed to Lebanon (then racked by the Lebanese Civil War) together with American and French troops as the Multinational Force in Lebanon. The stated aim of the Multinational Force was to oversee the withdrawal of the PLO from Lebanon but the deployment lasted beyond that point.

The Italian contingent of around 3,000 troops was led by then Brigadier General Angioni, that in the end was the most successful of the three deployed forces, raising the confidence of Italian leadership and people in the Armed Forces, recovering the low esteem in the public opinion caused by the defeat in World War II and paving the way to the subsequent increase in overseas missions for the Italian military.

The Multinational Force was withdrawn following the deadly 1983 Beirut barracks bombing that simultaneously struck the French and American forces. The Italian contingent was not targeted in this attack. The Italian force was withdrawn on 20 February 1984 (the US followed on 26 February and the last French troops left on 31 March). Two Italian military personnel died while serving in the Multinational Force in Lebanon.

Gulf War (1990–1991) 
Italy contributed 4 warships (plus one support ship) and Panavia Tornado IDS Interdictor/Strike aircraft to the Coalition of the Gulf War.

NATO intervention in the Bosnian War (1992–1995) 
Under the auspices of NATO, Italy participated in interventions in the Bosnian War (1992–1995). Italy took active part in Operation Deny Flight enforcing a no-fly zone over the war zone. Italian warships also took part in Operation Sharp Guard, a naval blockade enforcing an arms embargo and economic sanctions on the area of the former Yugoslavia. Italy was also part of the 1995 NATO bombing campaign in Bosnia and Herzegovina against Bosnian Serb targets.

Unified Task Force and United Nations Operation in Somalia II (1992–1995) 
Italian forces were part of the Unified Task Force and its successor United Nations Operation in Somalia II a United Nations peacekeeping force whose intervention in the Somali Civil War ultimately proved unsuccessful, ending in withdrawal in 1995.

Operation Alba (1997) 
Operation Alba was an Italian-led multinational peacekeeping force sent to Albania in 1997. Its stated intention was to help the Albanian government restore law and order in the troubled country after the 1997 rebellion in Albania.

The Italian 3rd Army Corps assumed responsibility for the 'Alba' Mission, the first multinational Italian-led mission. Fifteen contributing nations brought humanitarian aid to crisis-struck Albania.

Kosovo War (1999) 
Italy took part in the NATO bombing of Yugoslavia during the Kosovo War (1998–1999). The Italian Air Force operated with 34 Tornado, 12 F-104, 12 AMX, 2 B-707 and the Italian Navy operated with Harrier II. The Italian Navy also contributed a naval task force that included the aircraft carrier Giuseppe Garibaldi, a frigate (Maestrale) and a submarine (Sauro class), that operated with other NATO ships in the Adriatic sea.

Italian troops are part of the Kosovo Force, a NATO-led peacekeeping force that deployed to Kosovo after the end of the war in 1999.

War in Afghanistan (2001–2021) 

As part of Operation Enduring Freedom, launched by the United States in response to the September 11 attacks, Italy contributed to the international operation in Afghanistan. Italian forces are part of the ISAF, the NATO-led force in Afghanistan, and has had a Provincial reconstruction team in the country.

Italy initially sent 411 troops, based on one infantry company from the 2nd Alpini Regiment tasked to protect the ISAF HQ, one engineer company, one NBC platoon, one logistic unit, as well as liaison and staff elements integrated into the operation chain of command. Italian forces also command a multinational engineer task force and have deployed a platoon of Italian military police. Three AB 212 helicopters were also deployed to Kabul and four Panavia Tornado aircraft.

47 Italian military personnel have died while serving with ISAF.

Multi-National Force – Iraq (2003–2006) 
The Multi-National Force – Iraq consisted of the nations whose governments had military personnel stationed in Iraq. The Italian Army did not take part in initial combat operations of the 2003 Iraq War, dispatching troops after May 1, 2003 – when major combat operations were declared over by the U.S. President George W. Bush. Subsequently Italian troops arrived in the late summer of 2003, and began patrolling Nasiriyah and the surrounding area. On 26 May 2006, Italian foreign minister Massimo D'Alema announced that the Italian forces would be reduced to 1,600 by June. The last Italian troops were withdrawn from Iraq in September 2006.

33 Italian military personnel died while serving in Iraq. The greatest single loss of life was on November 12, 2003 when a suicide car bombing struck the Italian Carabinieri Corps HQ in Nasiriyah and killed a dozen Carabinieri, five Army soldiers, two Italian civilians, and eight Iraqi civilians.

Multi-National Force – Lebanon (2006–present) 

Operation Leonte – Under the UN mission UNIFIL, Italy sent naval units and 3,000 troops to control the southern Lebanon border.

2011 military intervention in Libya 
Italy was part of the initial coalition (later expanded to nineteen states) of states that intervened in the Libyan Civil War.

Deployments to Niger
In December 2017, Prime Minister Paolo Gentiloni announced that 470 Italian soldiers would be deployed to Niger in an effort to mitigate the European migrant crisis.

Notes

References and further reading
Arena, Nino. I Caccia Della Serie 5, Re2005, Mc205, Fiat G.G5 (in Italian). Modena, Italy: STEM-Mucchi, 1976. .
 Arfaioli, Maurizio. The Black Bands of Giovanni: Infantry and Diplomacy During the Italian Wars (1526–1528). Pisa: Pisa University Press, Edizioni Plus, 2005. .
 Baumgartner, Frederic J. Louis XII. New York: St. Martin's Press, 1994. .
 Beales, Derek & Eugenio Biagini. The Risorgimento and the Unification of Italy. Second Edition. London: Longman, 2002. 
 Black, Jeremy. "Dynasty Forged by Fire." MHQ: The Quarterly Journal of Military History 18, no. 3 (Spring 2006): 34–43. .
 Blockmans, Wim. Emperor Charles V, 1500–1558. Translated by Isola van den Hoven-Vardon. New York: Oxford University Press, 2002. . online
 Guicciardini, Francesco. The History of Italy. Translated by Sydney Alexander. Princeton: Princeton University Press, 1984. .
 Hackett, Francis. Francis the First. Garden City, New York: Doubleday, Doran & Co., 1937.
 Hall, Bert. Weapons and Warfare in Renaissance Europe: Gunpowder, Technology, and Tactics. Baltimore: Johns Hopkins University Press, 1997. .
Hart, B. H. Liddell. History of the Second World War. New York: G.P. Putnam's Sons, 1970.
 Kertzer, David. Prisoner of the Vatican. Boston: Houghton Mifflin Company, 2004.
 Konstam, Angus. Pavia 1525: The Climax of the Italian Wars. Oxford: Osprey Publishing, 1996. .
 Norwich, John Julius. A History of Venice. New York: Vintage Books, 1989. .
 Oman, Charles. A History of the Art of War in the Sixteenth Century. London: Methuen & Co., 1937.
 Paoletti, Ciro et al. "Current Situation of Italian Military Historiography." International Bibliography of Military History 29.1 (2008): 244-251.
 Phillips, Charles and Alan Axelrod. Encyclopedia of Wars. 3 vols. New York: Facts on File, 2005. .
 Smith, Denis Mack. Italy: A Modern History. Ann Arbor: The University of Michigan Press, 1959. Library of Congress Catalog Card Number: 5962503 online
 Taylor, Frederick Lewis. The Art of War in Italy, 1494–1529. Westport, Conn.: Greenwood Press, 1973. .

External links 
 Timeline of Italian history